Arbognophos is a genus of moths in the family Geometridae.

Species
 Arbognophos amoenaria (Staudinger, 1897)

References
 Arbognophos at Markku Savela's Lepidoptera and Some Other Life Forms

Gnophini
Geometridae genera